Thomas Moult (1893–1974) was a versatile English journalist and writer, and one of the Georgian poets. He is known for his annual anthologies Best Poems of the Year, 1922 to 1943, which were popular verse selections taken from periodicals on both sides of the Atlantic. His poem 'Truly He Hath A Sweet Bed' from Down Here the Hawthorn was set to music for chorus and orchestra by Cyril Rootham (as Brown Earth, 1921-2).

Life

He was born in Derbyshire, to Jewish parents. He wrote much newspaper criticism, on music and drama and as a book reviewer; and on sport in the popular press.

He founded a magazine, Voices, for young writers, in 1919, publishing Sherwood Anderson, A. E. Coppard, Louis Golding, F. V. Branford, and Neville Cardus. It has been described as "eminently uncontroversial".<ref>Robert H. Ross, The Georgian Revolt", p. 203.</ref>

From 1952 to 1962 he was president of the Poetry Society and chairman of the editorial board of Poetry Review.

Family

Moult's daughter Joy was the first wife of psychologist Oliver Zangwill.

WorksSnow over Elden (1920) novelDown Here the Hawthorn (1921) poemsCenotaph: A Book of Remembrance in Poetry and Prose for November the Eleventh (1923) editorThe Comely Lass (1923) novelForty Years in My Bookshop by Walter T. Spencer (1927) editorBarrie (1928) criticismDerbyshire Prose and Verse (1929) editorSaturday Night (1931) novelSally Go Round the Moon (1931)Playing for England by Jack Hobbs (1931) editorMary Webb: Her Life and Work (1932)W. H. Davies (1933)Willow Pattern (1934) cricket poemsBat and Ball'' (1935) cricket anthology

The Best Poems of 1931

Poets included were:

A. E. - Conrad Aiken - Margaret Emerson Bailey - T. O. Beachcroft - William Rose Benét - Anthony Bertram - Edmund Blunden - Kay Boyle - Nancy Campbell - Thomas Caldecott Chubb - Elizabeth Coatsworth - Robert P. Tristram Coffin - Jane Culver - W. H. Davies - John Gould Fletcher - John Galsworthy - Viola Gerard Garvin - Stella Gibbons - Wilfrid Gibson - G. Rostrevor Hamilton - Ernest Hartsock - F. R. Higgins - John Lee Higgins - Robert Hillyer - Thomas Hornsby Ferril - Helen Hoyt - Julian Huxley - Leslie Nelson Jennings - Geoffrey Johnson - Frank Kendon - Stanley Kimmel - Alfred Kreymborg - Ruth Lechlitner - Marie Luhrs - Sylvia Lynd - Alister Mackenzie - E. H. W. Meyerstein - Harold Monro - Virginia Moore - David Morton - Edwin Muir - Robert Nichols - Jessica Nelson North - Alfred Noyes - Doris Pailthorpe - Herbert E. Palmer - Dorothy Parker - Laurence Powys - Frederic Prokosch - Lizette Woodworth Reese - Sarah-Elizabeth Rodger - Robert L. Roe - James Rorty - A. Wolseley Russell - Lady Margaret Sackville - Anderson M. Scruggs - Leonora Speyer - J. C. Squire - L. Steni - L. A. G. Strong - Sara Teasdale - Katharine Tynan - A. R. Ubsdell - Marie de L. Welch - John Hall Wheelock - Mary Brent Whiteside - Humbert Wolfe - Barbara Young

Notes

External links

 
 
 
Archival Material at 

1893 births
1974 deaths
People from Derbyshire
English Jewish writers
English male poets
20th-century English poets
20th-century English male writers